Yaakov Pearlman was Chief Rabbi of Ireland from September 2001 to June 2008.

A native of Manchester, England, he became one of the youngest rabbis in Britain ever when he was ordained [earned semicha] by the Manchester, Rosh HaYeshiva, HaGaon HaRav Yehudah Ze'ev Segal, z't'l. He was then awarded a fellowship to attend Beth Medrash Govoha in Lakewood, New Jersey, where he studied directly under the HaGaon Harav Aaron Kotler, z't'l' and HaGaon Harav Schneur Kotler z't'l, for ten years.

Subsequently, Rabbi Pearlman earned a master's degree in Jewish history at Hofstra University in New York and a Ph.D in educational administration at the University of California, San Diego.

Included in his Rabbinic career are several years in Providence, Rhode Island, and Rochester, New York. After serving as the Rabbi of Congregation Beth Joseph Center in Rochester, he then was appointed as Rabbi of Congregation Light of Israel Sephardic Center, where he is currently senior Rabbi Emeritus. In addition, Rabbi Pearlman served on the faculties of Yeshivot and Jewish Day Schools as principal and teacher for more than 40 years.

In 2001, Rabbi Pearlman was appointed to the position of Chief Rabbi of Ireland, and held that office through 2008. During that tenure, he administered to the diverse needs of the Irish Jewish Community, including matters relating to Synagogue/Communal/Family, Torah education, Kashrut, and Shechitah. Moreover, as the Av Beit Din of Dublin, Rabbi Pearlman adjudicated many Halachic matters in collaboration with the Botei Dinim of London and Manchester.

He presently is a Rabbi in Beis Medrish and Mesivta of Baltimore, headed by Rabbi Tzvi Dov Slanger.

See also
History of the Jews in Ireland

References

Chief rabbis of Ireland
Living people
English Jews
Hofstra University alumni
20th-century American rabbis
21st-century rabbis
Year of birth missing (living people)